Entomologische Berichten is a Dutch journal with articles about insects, most of the texts are in Dutch language. It was first published in 1918. Today it is published six times a year.

References

Entomology journals and magazines
Publications established in 1918
Bimonthly journals
Dutch-language journals